ESADE Business School is a private college and graduate school located in Barcelona, Spain. It is part of ESADE (Catalan: Escola Superior d'Administració i Direcció d'Empreses, Spanish: Escuela Superior de Administración y Dirección de Empresas) and associated with Ramon Llull University. ESADE has been awarded the triple accreditation by EQUIS, AACSB and AMBA, and is ranked among the world's top business schools and law school programs by the Financial Times, The Economist, Forbes, QS World University Rankings and more.

History 
The ESADE project was conceived in the spring of 1954 by a group of Spanish professionals and entrepreneurs who later founded the university. The school signed an agreement with the Jesuits (Societas Iesu) in October 1958 and started offering its first academic programs in a small building in the district of Sant Gervasi, Barcelona. In 1958, ESADE was ultimately founded. Two years later, in 1960, executive education programmes were introduced. In 1964 the college's MBA programme was established. A year later, in 1965, ESADE's Barcelona campus (Av. Pedralbes) opened (Building I). In 2001, the school inaugurated its campus in Madrid (Chamartín), and two years later its campus in Buenos Aires, Argentina. Both are primarily used for Executive Education. In 2009 ESADE opened a new campus in Sant Cugat (Barcelona) as well as ESADE Creapolis, a technology park based on open innovation and situated on the new  Sant Cugat campus.

Programmes 

ESADE Business School offers a range of undergraduate and graduate degrees, as well as a doctoral program.

MSc Programmes in Management
 Master in International Management
 Master in Global Strategic Management
 Master in Finance
 Master in Marketing Management,
 Master in Innovation and Entrepreneurship
 Master in Business Analytics

Full-Time MBA 
The ESADE Business School offers an accelerated, customizable full-time MBA programme. Students can choose among a 12, 15 and 18-month track. The 12-month program is completed with classes from September to September, while the 15- and 18-month programs allow for either summer internships, exchanges with other MBA programmes worldwide, or both. In the first eight months students are divided into three sections, with whom they complete a significant portion of their studies in a team format. In the remaining terms, classes are completed on an elective basis. The student body is highly international, with 95% international students who represent 48 nationalities.

Executive Education 
ESADE Business School offers a range of programmes aimed at executives and experienced professionals. These programs include Executive MBAs, Executive Master Programmes, Open Programmes, and Custom Programmes. The Global Executive MBA (GEMBA) is taught in cooperation with the McDonough School of Business and the Edmund A. Walsh School of Foreign Service at Georgetown University in Washington D.C. The course follows a modular structure, with modules taught in the United States, Spain, Brazil, Argentina, India, and Russia. ESADE also offers an International Executive Master in Marketing & Sales (emms) in partnership with SDA Bocconi School of Management, Milan (Italy).

PhD in Management Sciences 
The ESADE Business School offers a PhD programme that consists of two parts: 
 A Master in Research (MRes) (duration: 1 year)
 A supervised research period (duration: 3 – 4 years)

International Rankings

Notable alumni 

Albert Rivera (born 1979), Spanish politician
Enrique Lores (born 1964/65), CEO of HP Inc.
Ramon Laguarta (born 1964), CEO of PepsiCo
Josep Maria Bartomeu (born 1963), Former President of FC Barcelona
Ferran Soriano (born 1967), CEO of Manchester City F.C.
Gabriel Escarrer Jaume (born 1971), Billionaire founder and CEO of Meliá Hotels International
Joan Rigol (born 1943), Former President of the Parliament of Catalonia
Iñaki Urdangarin (born 1968), Retired Spanish handball player
Albert Ollé Bartolomé (born 1964), Pioneer of the Call and Contact Center industry in Spain
Assumpta Escarp i Gibert (born 1957), Member of the Parliament of Catalonia for the Province of Barcelona
Javier Faus (born 1964), Chairman and CEO of Meridian Capital Partners 
Javier Ferrán (born 1956), Chairman of Diageo
Eva Granados (born 1975), Deputy of the Parliament of Catalonia for the Socialists' Party of Catalonia
Sabina Fluxà (born 1980), Vice-Chairman and CEO of Iberostar Hotels & Resorts
Patricia Gras (born 1960), American journalist, television anchor, reporter and producer
Jordi Hereu (born 1965), 117th Mayor of Barcelona
Alessandro Magnoli Bocchi (born 1968), Italian economist
Irene Rigau (born 1951), Former Counselor of Education of Catalonia
Sandro Rosell (born 1964), Former President of FC Barcelona
Josep Maria Vallès (born 1940), Spanish academic and politician
Risto Mejide (born 1974), Publicist, author, music producer, songwriter, talent show judge and TV presenter
Ernesto Lucena, Minister of Sports of Colombia
Xavier Espot Zamora (born 1979), Current Prime Minister of Andorra
Jaime Guardiola Romojaro (born 1957), CEO of Banco Sabadell

See also
 List of Jesuit sites

References

External links 
 ESADE Official Website

Business School
Business schools in Spain
Education in Barcelona
Jesuit universities and colleges in Spain
Educational institutions established in 1958
1958 establishments in Spain